Linden-Kildare High School is a public high school located 3.5 miles  southeast of Linden, Texas (USA). It is classified as a 2A school by the UIL. The school is part of the Linden-Kildare Consolidated Independent School District located in south central Cass County. The high school is a consolidation of Linden and Kildare schools. In 2015, the school was rated "Met Standard" by the Texas Education Agency.

Athletics
The school compete in the following sports:

Baseball
Basketball
Cross Country
Football
Golf
Powerlifting
Softball
Tennis
Track and Field
Volleyball

State Titles
Baseball - 
1980(2A)
Boys Basketball - 
1960(2A)
Girls Track - 
1998(3A), 1999(3A)

Notable alumni

 Don Henley - Founding member of The Eagles
 John Beasley (basketball)  -  Professional Basketball Player
 Richard Bowden - Musician and member of Pinkard and Bowden Country duo
Edd Hargett - Professional Football Player
Shock Linwood - American football running back

References

External links
Linden-Kildare ISD

Schools in Cass County, Texas
Public high schools in Texas